Priscopedatidae is a prehistoric family of extinct sea cucumbers.

References

External links 

 
 

 
Prehistoric echinoderm families